Garth Alexander Rizzuto (born September 11, 1947) is a Canadian former professional ice hockey centre who played in the National Hockey League (NHL) and the World Hockey Association (WHA) during the 1970s. He played 37 games for the Vancouver Canucks of the NHL in 1970–71 and 110 games for the Winnipeg Jets of the WHA between 1972 and 1974, as well as several years in the minor CHL and American Hockey League. He retired in 1974.

Playing career
A hard-working center, Rizzuto came up through the system of the Chicago Blackhawks, turning pro in 1967. He spent three solid years in the minors with the Dallas Black Hawks, but never saw an NHL game in Chicago. In the 1970 NHL Expansion Draft he was claimed by the Vancouver Canucks.

Rizzuto spent most of the 1970–71 season on the Canucks' roster as a utility player, recording 3 goals and 4 assists for 7 points in 37 games. He is the first player born and trained in British Columbia to suit up with the Canucks and score for the team. For the 1971–72 season, he was sent to the minors.

For the 1972–73 season, Rizzuto signed on with the Winnipeg Jets of the rival upstart World Hockey Association. He was his best professional season, recording 10 goals and 20 points, helping a team led by Bobby Hull to the Avco Cup finals. In 1973–74, however, his role would be reduced and he finished with 3 goals and 7 points in 41 games. He retired after a brief stint as a player-coach of the Nelson Maple Leafs of the Western International Hockey League at the start of the 1974-75 season.

Post-playing career
He now resides in Fernie, British Columbia as the owner of Rizzuto Construction and is a boxing trainer.

Career statistics

Regular season and playoffs

External links
 

1947 births
Living people
Canadian ice hockey centres
Canadian people of Italian descent
Dallas Black Hawks players
Ice hockey people from British Columbia
Rochester Americans players
Seattle Totems (WHL) players
Sportspeople from Trail, British Columbia
Vancouver Canucks players
Western International Hockey League players
Winnipeg Jets (WHA) players